The following are the subregional records in athletics in Northern America. This list includes the best marks set in an event by an athlete who competes for the World Athletics member federations Athletics Canada or USA Track & Field. All bests shown on this list are tracked by statisticians not officially sanctioned by a governing body. World Athletics maintains its official Area Records (continental records), in this case the North American, Central American and Caribbean records, which include the best marks set in an event by an athlete who competes for a member federation of the North American, Central American and Caribbean Athletic Association.

Outdoor
Key to tables:

+ = en route to a longer distance

A = affected by altitude

# = not officially ratified by national federation

≠ = annulled by World Athletics due to doping violation, but nevertheless ratified by the USATF

a = aided road course according to IAAF rule 260.28

X = annulled due to doping violation

OT = oversized track (> 200 m in circumference)

Men

Women

Mixed

Indoor

Men

Women

Notes

References

External links 

North American

fr:Records d'Amérique du Nord d'athlétisme